S.K. Victoria Wanderers Football Club is a Maltese football club from the town of Victoria, Gozo. They were founded in 1958 and throughout the club's history, they have won the Gozo Football League First Division championship once, as Victoria United during the 1978–79 season.

History
The club was founded as Victoria City in 1958 to play in the Second Division of the Gozo Football League; the town of Victoria already had a long tradition in Maltese football through several older defunct clubs and the still present Victoria Hotspurs.

Early years
Victoria picked up their first piece of silverware during 1962–63 by winning the Gozitan Second Division, they were promoted to the top level of the island's football system. Their name was changed to SK Wanderers in 1963 for their step up to the top league.

After four seasons in the Gozitan First Division, the club were thrown out of the league and banned for two seasons. To get around this, the club refounded as Sabina United for the following season in the Second Division, where they managed to gain promotion straight back into the top division. For their second return to the top division in 1968, they went under the name Victoria Wanderers, but were relegated straight back down.

League success
This time they stayed for a longer spell in the Second Division, gaining promotion in the 1973–74 season as Victoria United, the league had also been expanded from six clubs, to eleven for a season. However, this was to be a yo-yo time for a club and they bounced between the two leagues during the decade, picking up the Second Division title for the third time in 1977–78.

Victoria United were crowned champions of Gozo in 1978–79, just a year after they had won the Second Division. This was the most prestigious title won by the club, and the only time they have finished top in the whole of Gozo. It didn't last long for the club as they were soon bouncing between the leagues again, winning a fourth Second Division title.

Recent times
During 1991 the name of the club was changed back to one which they had used during the 1960s; SK Victoria Wanderers, the first season back under that name the club won the Second Division. Since winning the Second Division Championship in 07/08, the club have played continually in the First Division, finishing 3rd in 2011/2012.

Current squad

Honours
Gozo First Division
Champions: 1978–1979
Gozo Second Division
Champions: 1962–1963, 1967–1968, 1977–1978, 1983–1984, 1991–1992, 2007–2008
GFA Cup 
Champions: 2008–2009
Independence Cup 	
2010–2011
Freedom Day Cup 
Champions: 2008–2009
ESSO Cup
Champions: 1964–1965
Galea Cup
Champions: 1965–1966
Second Division Knock-Out Cup
Champions: 1977–1978, 2001–2002, 2002–2003, 2007–2008
Second Division Challenge Cup
Champions: 2006–2007, 2007–2008

References

External links
S.K. Victoria Wanderers Football Club Official Website

Victoria Wanderers
Victoria Wanderers
Victoria, Gozo